Hiroshi Sakaguchi is a Japanese carpenter and the founder of Ki Arts (1985), a traditional Japanese company in Northern California. He is featured in Tao Ruspoli's film Being in the World.

References

American carpenters
Japanese carpenters
Living people
Year of birth missing (living people)